Maryland House of Delegates District 30A is one of the 67 districts that compose the Maryland House of Delegates. Along with subdistrict 30B, it makes up the 30th district of the Maryland Senate. District 30A includes part of Anne Arundel County, and is represented by two delegates.

Demographic characteristics
As of the 2020 United States census, the district had a population of 82,120, of whom 66,039 (80.4%) were of voting age. The racial makeup of the district was 54,897 (66.8%) White, 11,659 (14.2%) African American, 411 (0.5%) Native American, 1,994 (2.4%) Asian, 37 (0.0%) Pacific Islander, 7,015 (8.5%) from some other race, and 6,111 (7.4%) from two or more races. Hispanic or Latino of any race were 12,035 (14.7%) of the population.

The district had 59,387 registered voters as of October 17, 2020, of whom 12,550 (21.1%) were registered as unaffiliated, 17,524 (29.5%) were registered as Republicans, 28,478 (48.0%) were registered as Democrats, and 443 (0.7%) were registered to other parties.

Past Election Results

2014

2018

References

30A